Hayes Township is one of eighteen townships in Buena Vista County, Iowa, USA.  As of the 2000 census, its population was 1,144.

Geography
According to the USGS, it contains two cemeteries: Hayes Township and Saint Marys.

References

External links
 US-Counties.com
 City-Data.com

Townships in Buena Vista County, Iowa
Townships in Iowa